Yelcho Base is a Chilean Antarctic research base. It is located on the shore of the South Bay, Doumer Island.

The station was built in 1962 by the Chilean Army and was given to the INACH in 1980. It was abandoned between 1998 and 2014, and was reopened in 2015.

Toponymy 
It is named for the Yelcho that was commanded by Luis Pardo, who saved the Shacketon's Expedition in 1916 from the Elephant Island.

History 
The construction of the base was initiated by the Chilean Navy during the 16th Antarctic campaign of Chile, and was completed in the following season, on 18 February 1962.

See also
 List of Antarctic research stations
 List of Antarctic field camps

References

External links
 Official website Chilean Antarctic Institute

Chilean Antarctic Territory
1962 establishments in Antarctica
Doumer Island